The Cours de Vincennes (formerly Avenue de Vincennes) is a street in Paris, linking place de la Nation to porte de Vincennes. It forms a major artery and serves as the border between the city's 12th and 20th arrondissements. It was built before 1860 and forms the start of Route nationale 34.

Junctions 

On its south side it has junctions with:
 boulevard de Picpus
 rue Marsoulan, formerly rue Ruty, renamed 1912
 avenue du Docteur-Arnold-Netter, part of avenue du Général-Michel-Bizot until 1962
 passage de la Voûte
 boulevard Soult

On its north side it has junctions with:
 boulevard de Charonne
 rue Lucien-et-Sacha-Guitry, known as rue Lucien-Guitry until 1969
 rue Félix-Huguenet
 rue des Pyrénées
 rue des Maraîchers
 rue du Général-Niessel
 boulevard Davout

Buildings

References

Vincennes
Vincennes